Antoine-Frédéric Gresnick (2 March 1755 – 16 October 1799) was a Belgian classical composer. He was born in Liège. He studied music in Naples. By 1780 Gresnick was working in Lyons and, after visiting Berlin and London, he moved in 1794 to Paris where he died in 1799. He is chiefly remembered for writing opera buffa, of which he wrote at least twenty-three.

Famous works
Alceste, a 1786 opera
L'amour de Cythère exilé, a 1793 opera

External links
 

1755 births
1799 deaths
Classical-period composers
Male opera composers
Prince-Bishopric of Liège musicians
18th-century classical composers
18th-century male musicians
18th-century musicians